Ahead Rings Out is the debut album by British blues-rock band Blodwyn Pig, released in 1969. The band had been formed in 1969 by Mick Abrahams, the former guitarist of Jethro Tull, and sales of Ahead Rings Out rivalled those of Jethro Tull’s next album, Stand Up, reaching No. 9 on the British album chart.

The album contained  a healthy mixture of various styles of progressive blues and “The Modern Alchemist” displayed the jazz influence and saxophone skills of Jack Lancaster.

It was voted number 15 in the All-Time 50 Long Forgotten Gems from Colin Larkin's All Time Top 1000 Albums.

Background
In liner notes for the 2001 re-issue of the album, songwriter and singer Mick Abrahams recalled: 

About “See My Way”, he comments: “It was a solid two days work to get it just how we felt it should be with all the odd changes of tempo and feel, i.e. the section that sounds like Ravel’s Boléro ... That song didn’t go on the UK version of Ahead Rings Out, but instead the powers that be decided in their wisdom to put it on the USA version and left it until we recorded the second album, Getting to This.”

He described “The Modern Alchemist”  as “a great composition of Jack Lancaster’s that brought a mixture of hard hybrid jazz-rock flavour to the album.”

The album art inspired the mascot and art for the St. Louis based FM radio station KSHE 95.

Track listing

UK release

“It's Only Love” (Mick Abrahams) – 3:23
“Dear Jill” (Abrahams) – 5:19
“Sing Me a Song That I Know” (Abrahams) – 3:08
“The Modern Alchemist” (Jack Lancaster) – 5:38
“Up and Coming” (Abrahams, Lancaster, Andy Pyle, Ron Berg) – 5:31
“Leave It With Me” (Lancaster) – 3:52
“The Change Song” (Abrahams) – 3:45
“Backwash” (Abrahams, Lancaster, Pyle, Berg) – 0:53
“Ain’t Ya Comin’ Home, Babe?” (Abrahams, Lancaster, Pyle) – 6:04

 Bonus tracks on 2006 EMI Digital Remaster reissue CD:

10. “Sweet Caroline” (Abrahams) – 2:51
11. “Walk on the Water” (Abrahams) – 3:42
12. “Summer Day” (Abrahams, Pyle) – 3:44
13. “Same Old Story” (Abrahams) – 2:36
14. “Slow Down” (Larry Williams) – 4:20
15. “Meanie Mornay” (Abrahams) – 4:45
16. “Backwash” (Abrahams, Lancaster, Pyle, Berg) – 0:53

NB: CD reissue has track 8 as "See My Way", as per comments above regarding US track listing, hence track 8 from the UK release "Backwash" being included as a bonus track 16.

U.S. release

“It's Only Love” (Mick Abrahams) – 3:23
“Dear Jill” (Abrahams) – 5:19
“Walk on the Water” (Abrahams) – 3:42
“The Modern Alchemist” (Jack Lancaster) – 5:38
"See My Way" (Abrahams) – 5:00
“Summer Day” (Abrahams, Pyle) – 3:44
“The Change Song” (Abrahams) – 3:45
“Backwash” (Abrahams, Lancaster, Pyle, Berg) – 0:53
“Ain’t Ya Comin’ Home, Babe?” (Abrahams, Lancaster, Pyle) – 6:04

Personnel
 Mick Abrahams – guitar, vocals, seven-string slide guitar
 Jack Lancaster – flute, violin, tenor sax, baritone sax, soprano sax, brass arrangements
 Andy Pyle – electric bass, six-string bass
 Ron Berg – drums

Reception
Melody Maker stated, "An excellent debut with lots of exciting music. The album has direction and thought and gives a great deal of hope for the future of the often maligned progressive pop scene." New Musical Express wrote, "Hooting grunting blues mingled with snorts of jazz adds up to an excellent debut album from one of our most promising groups."

References

External links 
 Blodwyn Pig – Ahead Rings Out (1969) album review by Mike DeGagne, credits & releases at AllMusic.com
 Blodwyn Pig – Ahead Rings Out (1969) album releases & credits at Discogs.com
 Blodwyn Pig – Ahead Rings Out (1969) album credits & user reviews at ProgArchives.com
 Blodwyn Pig – Ahead Rings Out (1969) album to be listened as stream at Play.Spotify.com

Blodwyn Pig albums
1969 debut albums
Island Records albums
Albums produced by Andy Johns
Albums arranged by Jack Lancaster